Rhododendron indicum is an Azalea Rhododendron species native to Japan (S & W Honshu, Shikoku, Kyushu, Yakushima).

Taxonomy
It is the type species for the Tsutsusi section and subsection, and was the original Tsutsusi described by Engelbert Kaempfer in Japan in 1712, from the Japanese name Kirishima-tsutsuji.

Cultivation 
There are many cultivars, including the Satsuki azaleas.

Gallery

References

Bibliography 
 The Linnaean Plant Name Typification Project: Azalea indica L. 
 Steve Cafferty and Charles E. Jarvis. Typification of Linnaean Plant Names in Ericaceae. Taxon Vol. 51, No. 4 (Nov., 2002), pp. 751-753

External links 
 Hirsutum.com

indicum
Flora of Japan
Plants described in 1753
Taxa named by Carl Linnaeus